Provinsbanken was Denmark's fifth-largest bank in 1990 when it merged with Danske Bank and Handelsbanken (not affiliated with the Swedish Handelsbanken). Provinsbanken dates back to 1846, when Fyens Disconto Kasse was established by a group of Odense merchants under the leadership of Lorentz Bierfreund. It was the country's first private bank.

References

External links

Banks of Denmark
Banks established in 1846
Danish companies established in 1846